Gharganeh, also rendered as Qarganeh, may refer to:
 Gharganeh, Shadegan